Paroecobius is a genus of spiders in the family Oecobiidae. It was first described in 1981 by Lamoral. , it contains 2 species, found in South Africa and Botswana.

References

Oecobiidae
Araneomorphae genera
Spiders of Africa